"The Hobo Code" is the eighth episode of the first season of the American television drama series Mad Men. It was written by Chris Provenzano and directed by Phil Abraham. The episode originally aired on September 6, 2007 on the AMC channel in the United States.

Plot
Peggy and Pete arrive early to work—Pete because he's moving into his new apartment later that day, and Peggy because she is nervous about the Belle Jolie meeting. In the office, Pete seduces Peggy and they have sex on the sofa, then complains to her that his wife doesn't understand him. He also confesses that he never read the Belle Jolie copy, but she is relieved as she thought he didn't like it. Later, Trudy unexpectedly visits Pete with a bottle of champagne, Pete is flustered and argues with her for showing up unannounced.

Out of the blue, Bert gives Don a check for $2,500, telling him that his talent is appreciated, and then he urges him to read Atlas Shrugged. Later, Don presents Peggy's campaign ideas to the executives from the makeup company Belle Jolie. The pitch emphasizes that a woman wants to "mark her man" and show the world she owns him. After some manipulation by Don, the pitch is accepted. Peggy is invited into Don's office to have a drink with the team to celebrate. The other office ladies are excited at Peggy's success, except for Joan who implies that Peggy should focus on what she has "downstairs" for success. Nevertheless, they all go to a bar to celebrate and are joined by the junior execs.

At Peggy's celebration, she's very vivacious while Pete just glares at her. When she asks him to dance The Twist, Pete rejects her for being forward and walks out, leaving Peggy shocked. Meanwhile, Sal meets up with Belle Jolie executive Elliott at a restaurant, and the two men connect. However, when Elliott invites Sal back to his room, Sal remains too afraid to follow through on his attraction to men.

That night, Don arrives at Midge's apartment, intending to take her on a trip to Paris with his bonus. However, he finds her with her beatnik friends, preparing to smoke marijuana. She declines the Paris trip so he agrees to stay with them, despite antagonism from some of Midge's friends. After getting high, Don retreats to the bathroom, where he flashes back to his childhood spent on a farm during the Great Depression.  

A hobo approaches his family, asking for food in exchange for work. Don's father Archie tells the man to move on, because the family are no longer Christians. Dick's stepmother Abigail refutes this and invites the man to stay for dinner. The hobo is revealed to be well-mannered and from New York. Abigail offers him money, but Archie tells him he will get paid the next day. That night, Dick approaches the man and asks about his life. The man tells him that he once had a family and responsibilities, but he gave it all up in exchange for the freedom of the road. Dick tells the man that Abigail is not his real mother, and that he is a "whore-child." The man also shows Dick the "hobo code". The next day, Archie refuses to pay him as promised, and as the hobo leaves the farm, Dick finds the symbol for "a dishonest man" carved into a fence post in front of their home.

Back in the present, Don takes a Polaroid photo of Midge and her friend Roy, and, looking at the photo, realizes the two of them are in love. They criticize Don for what he does—lying and worrying about trivialities while people die. He invites Midge to Paris again, and when she turns him down, he signs over the check, suggesting she buy a car. Upon returning home, he wakes Bobby while his sister is asleep nearby and tells him that he can ask him anything he wants and promises never to lie to him.

The next day Peggy again arrives early to the office and searches for Pete. Later, Pete arrives but doesn't even glance at Peggy, leaving her hurt.

Reception
The episode was received very positively by critics. Alan Sepinwall, writing for New Jersey's The Star-Ledger, praised the episode, specifically the subplot about Sal and Elliott, writing that the scene was "superb." Andrew Johnston, writing for Slant Magazine, called the episode "the most polished and, to my mind, the most moving episode of Mad Men yet."

References

External links
"The Hobo Code" at AMC

Mad Men (season 1) episodes
2007 American television episodes